Subcutaneous fat necrosis of the newborn  is a rare form of lobular panniculitis occurring in newborns that is usually self-remitting and non-recurring. Proposed causes include perinatal stress, local trauma, hypoxia and hypothermia, though the exact cause is unknown. It has been suggested that the brown fat seen in newborns is more sensitive to hypoxic injury than fat seen in adults, and that such hypoxia, usually in the context of a complicated birth, leads to the fat necrosis. Complications can include hypercalcemia, hyperlipidemia, dehydration, hypoglycemia, seizures, vomiting,  constipation, and thrombocytopenia, and can present months after the onset of SCFN symptoms.

See also 
 Pancreatic panniculitis
 Panniculitis

References

External links 

 eMedicine entry for Subcutaneous fat necrosis of the newborn

Conditions of the subcutaneous fat